Ullrich Hepperlin, known as Method, or the Method, is an American musician. He is the programmer, bassist and keyboard player for rock band Godhead. He is also a prominent solo songwriter, remixer and producer, as well as a graphic designer and web designer.

Hepperlin lives in Los Angeles and is currently employed as an environmental graphics designer and signage project manager for the H Toji Companies in Long Beach, California.

References

Year of birth missing (living people)
Living people
American heavy metal keyboardists
Godhead (band) members
Alternative metal bass guitarists